Richard D. Olasz (June 14, 1930 – April 8, 2010) was a former Democratic member of the Pennsylvania House of Representatives.

References

Democratic Party members of the Pennsylvania House of Representatives
2010 deaths
1930 births